Kevin D. Freeman, CFA, is founder and CEO of Freeman Global Holdings and a New York Times bestselling author. He is founder and chairman of the NSIC Institute, a Senior Fellow of the Center for Security Policy, a co-founder of The Adam Smith Foundation, and advisor to the National Federation of Republican Assemblies, and a contributing editor to The Counter Terrorist magazine. He is a 1983 graduate of The University of Tulsa.

Freeman is author of Investing in Separate Accounts (2002), Secret Weapon: How Economic Terrorism Brought Down the U.S. Stock Market and Why It can Happen Again (2012), and Game Plan: How to Protect Yourself from the Coming Cyber-Economic Attack (2014).

References

Living people
1960s births
University of Tulsa alumni 

20th-century American businesspeople
American financial writers
CFA charterholders
American chief executives